Tough Tenors is an album by saxophonists Johnny Griffin and Eddie "Lockjaw" Davis recorded in 1960 and released on the Jazzland label.

Reception

The Allmusic site awarded the album 4 stars stating: "Tough Tenors is one of the many amazing jazz recordings from 1960, and will please saxophone fans, Davis/Griffin fans, and anyone who enjoys classic hard bop."

Track listing 
 "Tickle Toe" (Lester Young) - 5:30    
 "Save Your Love for Me" (Buddy Johnson) - 7:09    
 "Twins" (Eddie "Lockjaw" Davis, Johnny Griffin) - 6:35    
 "Funky Fluke" (Bennie Green) - 9:16    
 "Imagination" (Johnny Burke, Jimmy Van Heusen) - 4:29    
 "Soft Winds" (Benny Goodman, Fletcher Henderson) - 7:17

Personnel 
 Eddie "Lockjaw" Davis - tenor saxophone, except track 5,  Johnny Griffin - tenor saxophone
 Junior Mance - piano
 Larry Gales - bass
 Ben Riley - drums

References 

Johnny Griffin albums
Eddie "Lockjaw" Davis albums
1960 albums
Albums produced by Orrin Keepnews
Jazzland Records (1960) albums